Sibs is an American sitcom broadcast by ABC from September 17, 1991 until April 29, 1992. The series chronicled the relationship of three sisters, and the support the youngest two especially needed from their eldest married sister. Sibs was created by Heide Perlman and executive produced by Perlman, James L. Brooks and Sam Simon, all of whom had been showrunners of Fox's The Tracey Ullman Show. The series was backed by Brooks' Gracie Films company and Columbia Pictures Television.

Synopsis
Sibs starred Marsha Mason as Nora Ruscio, a successful accountant and Alex Rocco as her long-suffering husband, Howie. The source of most of Howie's frustration was his wife's younger sisters (the siblings, or "sibs", of the title), Audie (Margaret Colin) and Lily (Jami Gertz). Audie was a real estate agent and hence almost unemployed in the era's weak market; she was also recovering from a recent bout of alcoholism. Lily had just been dumped by her boyfriend, who had fled to Germany without her, and had a host of other problems. Both sisters brought all of their problems to Nora, continuing a pattern that had apparently begun when they were all children. In the beginning of the pilot, Nora was distraught after just having learned that the head of her accounting firm had died. Nora's late boss had left the firm to his boorish, whiny nephew Warren Morris (Dan Castellaneta), who was another ongoing character. Shortly after inheriting his uncle's firm, Warren had fired Nora, only to learn that she was the one most of the client base had trusted, and that most of them left with her. He was now unemployed and constantly begging Nora for a job.

The original title proposed for the series was Grown-ups.

Cast
Marsha Mason as Nora Ruscio
Alex Rocco as Howie Ruscio
Margaret Colin as Audie
Jami Gertz as Lily
Dan Castellaneta as Warren Morris

Episodes

Broadcast

Sibs premiered as a preview telecast on Tuesday, September 17, 1991 at 9:30/8:30c, utilizing a lead-in from Roseanne and airing one hour after the series premiere of Home Improvement. The following night, the show began airing in its regular Wednesday 9:30/8:30c time period, kicking off the latter half of the three-hour Wednesday comedy block that ABC was promoting as The Hump.

Ultimately, Sibs had very little appeal to a mass audience, and garnered weak ratings in its first month on the air. The series' low ratings adversely affected the shows that followed it, Anything but Love and Good & Evil, another freshman comedy, which, in its own right, was struggling due to its 10:30/9:30c scheduling and controversy over its storylines. Sibs was put on hiatus in late October 1991 as the three-hour sitcom block was discontinued (Anything but Love moved into Sibs''' time slot, while Good & Evil was canceled). The remaining episodes were aired by ABC in April and May of 1992, on Tuesdays at 9:30/8:30c (again following Roseanne), and the series was officially canceled during May 1992 upfronts.

After cancellation: Related By Birth
In 1993, a year after the series' cancellation, Heide Perlman proposed a new comedy pilot for ABC which was a re-conceived version of Sibs. Perlman was successful in having Margaret Colin, Jami Gertz and Dan Castellaneta participate in the new pilot, in which all reprised their Sibs characters of Audie, Lily and Warren respectively. ABC greenlighted the pilot, titled Related By Birth, and it was produced later that year. This incarnation focused on the close relationship of sisters Audie and Lily, with no mention as to the existence of older sister Nora or brother-in-law Howie (as Marsha Mason and Alex Rocco declined to appear in this project). Audie, who had been cynical and icy in Sibs, exhibited a softer personality in this version, whereas Lily was portrayed as more neurotic. Warren, whose character had also become more subdued, was a companion of the girls, while the new supporting cast included Mark Nassar as Audie's frantic, entrepreneurial boss Michael Brickman and Grayson McCouch as Henry, Lily's assistant in a catering business. ABC aired Related By Birth as a summer pilot special on July 2, 1994, but passed on developing the project into a weekly series.

References
Brooks, Tim and Marsh, Earle, The Complete Directory to Prime Time Network and Cable TV Shows''

External links
 

American Broadcasting Company original programming
1990s American sitcoms
1991 American television series debuts
1992 American television series endings
Television series by Sony Pictures Television
Television series by Gracie Films
English-language television shows
Television series about siblings
Television shows set in New Jersey